Swedish Dicks is an American-Swedish comedy web television series created by Peter Stormare, Glenn Lund, Peter Settman, and Andrew Lowery. The plot follows two unlicensed Swedish private investigators trying to make a living in Los Angeles. It premiered on September 2, 2016, via Swedish online streaming service Viaplay. In the United States, the series premiered on the Pop television network on August 9, 2017, as well as being distributed worldwide by American company Lionsgate Television. In October 2016, the series was renewed for a second season which premiered on December 25, 2017, in Northern Europe and premiered in 2018 in the United States.

Premise
A former stuntman, Ingmar Andersson (Peter Stormare), works as a private investigator in Los Angeles. His life crosses paths with struggling DJ Axel Kruse (Johan Glans). After giving up his DJ career, he decides to join Ingmar and becomes a partner of his detective firm "Swedish Dick" (now "Swedish Dicks"). Together, they solve various cases, as well as compete with Ingmar's long-time rival and owner of the best investigating company in Los Angeles, Jane McKinney (Traci Lords). Axel is also trying to discover Ingmar's past and the circumstances of his retirement from stunt performing.

Production
Peter Stormare came up with the concept for Swedish Dicks in 2014. He began writing the script for what was intended to become a one-hour drama. When he showed the script to Peter Settman, he suggested that it would be better as a series. Stormare was inspired by his real-life friends, one ex-military and the other an ex-stuntman, who really did become private investigators.

Casting
The series was announced in November 2015 with Peter Stormare and Johan Glans confirmed for the cast. In March 2016, it was announced that Keanu Reeves and Traci Lords had joined the show. Stormare confirmed he wrote the part of Jane McKinney with Lords in mind: "I had never met her, but whenever I saw her in a photo or anything, I just felt a connection to that face. And then she had written a book that is fantastic, about her survival, and how that girl survived is a miracle. So it was like a voice within me when I was writing, saying, 'You have to get Traci Lords, Traci Lords, Traci Lords.' Like she was channeling me." Lords described Jane as "the kind of a woman who likes to play with men and use her femininity. At the same time, she believes that she definitely has the biggest dick in the room."

Cast
 Peter Stormare as Ingmar Andersson
 Johan Glans as Axel Kruse, Axel Magnus Enström
 Vivian Bang as Sun
 Felisha Cooper as Sarah Andersson
 Keanu Reeves as Tex Johnson
 Traci Lords as Jane McKinney
 Stephanie Koenig as Eve

Episodes

Season 1 (2016)

Season 2 (2017)

Broadcast
The first two episodes of Swedish Dicks premiered on September 2, 2016, via Swedish online streaming service Viaplay. Later that month, it was announced that the series had been picked up by American network Lionsgate TV to be distributed worldwide, and premiered in the United States on the Pop television network on August 9, 2017. In October 2016, the series was renewed for a second season. It aired in December 2017 in Northern Europe and January 2018 in the United States.

Reception

Swedish Dicks received mixed reviews from critics. Karolina Fjellborg of Aftonbladet wrote: "Initially, I felt a concern that this series would be more silly than funny, but soon I realized that it is actually both - and it works." Pål Nisja Wilhelmsen of SIDE3 found the first episode "shockingly weak" but pointed out that "the two leading roles have a good chemistry, and the script gives them room for friendly banter". He added that the series is "entertaining enough, but is probably no classic." Roger Wilson of Sveriges Radio wrote that Swedish Dicks is "one of those strange Swedish productions, where you think you do not need any act or joke if you just set it the United States and add guest appearances by Traci Lords and Keanu Reeves. It gets a little better when Traci Lords is in order, she can at least understand that she is part of a slapstick series." Steve Greene of IndieWire wrote: "Yet, “Swedish Dicks” still has one ray of hope in the form of Keanu Reeves. Though he only appears for the briefest of moments, his presence and giddy deliveries of southern twang pep talks are at that ideal intersection between heightened genre riffing and a dash of needed pathos. As the spectral memory of Ingmar's deceased stuntman partner Tex, Reeves is the kind of anchoring force that the rest of the scenes without him are in search of."

References

External links

 
 

2016 American television series debuts
2018 American television series endings
2010s American comedy television series
2010s American crime television series
Swedish comedy television series
Swedish crime television series
Television series by Lionsgate Television
Television shows filmed in Los Angeles
Television shows set in Los Angeles